Dominique-René de Lerma (born December 8, 1928) was an American musicologist and professor of music history, specializing in African-American music.

De Lerma taught at the Lawrence University Conservatory of Music, in Appleton, Wisconsin. He published over 1000 works on music.

De Lerma died on October 15, 2015 .

Selected publications

References
 Symphony, January–February 1994
 Gene Lees jazzletter (v10n8, August 1991) p3.
 African music: A pan-African annotated bibliography, p90.
 American music, summer 1988, v6n2, p246.
 Maultsby, Portia K.; Isaac Kalumbu. "African American Studies". The Continuum Encyclopedia of Popular Music of the World. pp. 47–54.
 Sphinx Organization - Dominique-Rene de Lerma -
 Guide to the Dominique-René de Lerma Collection, Center for Black Music Research, Columbia College Chicago
 U.M. Score
 Dominique-René de Lerma Curriculum Vitæ

Living people
1928 births
20th-century American musicologists
Lawrence University faculty